Matthew Godfrey (born October 20, 1971) is a Canadian actor and acting teacher. He is known for his role on the Canadian television series You Can't Do That on Television and has appeared in films and numerous television series.

Career
Godfrey was born in Ottawa, Ontario and educated in Montreal, Quebec at the National Theatre School of Canada. He has taught Shakespeare, Red Nose Clown and Improv in Germany, Norway, Turkey, U.S., China, Indonesia, England and India for the International Schools Theatre Association. Also in November 2012, he attended the ISTA Middle School Festival in Bangkok, Thailand, where he was an ensemble leader, and the theme was 'waves of change'.

Godfrey is most famous for his role as himself on the Canadian children's television show You Can't Do That on Television.  He was on the show from 1986 to 1987, with his debut in the Season 7 episode "Know-It-Alls". His character was portrayed as the "know-it-all" of the show, whose huge knowledge base inadvertently annoyed his castmates. His normal clothing style was scholarly well-dressed, including a shirt, tie and the occasional sweater vest. His younger brother Amyas also appeared on the show and on occasion they were in the same sketch.

Godfrey has appeared in several films and shows including Iron Eagle IV, The Private Capital, PSI Factor: Chronicles of the Paranormal, Once a Thief, Jonovision, Madonna: Innocence Lost, Dogg's Hamlet, Cahoot's Macbeth, The Private Capital, Blocked, Killing Moon, The Great Defender, Out of Omaha, Boogies Diner, and Nobody's Business  He also voiced several characters in the children's animated television series Dennis the Menace.

Filmography

References 

The Universe 101: Theatre review, Matthew Godfrey, Ian Harvey Stone. STAGE RAW. June 2018. Retrieved 20 March 2020.

External links 

1971 births
Living people
Canadian male child actors
Canadian male film actors
Canadian male television actors
Canadian male voice actors
Canadian television personalities
Male actors from Ottawa